The Problem of Political Authority: An Examination of the Right to Coerce and the Duty to Obey is a book by University of Colorado philosophy professor Michael Huemer released in January 2013. The first part of the book argues in detail for Huemer's interpretation of philosophical anarchism and argues against the legitimacy of political authority, while the second addresses political anarchism and the practical viability of anarcho-capitalism.

History and promotion
In April 2011, while he was still writing the book (then titled Freedom and Authority), Huemer was profiled by the Arts and Sciences Magazine of the University of Colorado, Boulder. The profile quoted Huemer as saying that political authority is "a moral illusion we’re suffering from."

In May 2012, a few months prior to the publication of the book, Huemer defended the argument of the book in a video.

Reception
Ole Martin Moen of the University of Oslo, Norway, reviewed the book in Philosophical Quarterly. Moen concluded his review by writing: "In addition to being a solid scholarly work, Huemer’s book will work well as assigned reading in classes on political philosophy. It is bound to spark debate, and its inclusion would help remedy the sad fact that anarchism is often either ignored or put aside without serious engagement. This is a pity, for even if one rejects his conclusions, Huemer makes it clear that anarchism is a sophisticated theory that deserves careful consideration."

The book has also been reviewed in Ethics by George Klosko, Mind by Daniel Viehoff, and Le Québécois Libre by Bradley Doucet.

Related books by others
 The Machinery of Freedom by David D. Friedman lays out the groundwork of the vision of an anarcho-capitalist society that Huemer builds on in Part II. Tomasz Kaye, the creator of the George Ought to Help video series, argued that Huemer's treatment of the subject was superior to that of Friedman.
 For a New Liberty by Murray Rothbard provides (along with Friedman's work) much of the basis for Chapter 10's discussion of "Individual Security in a Stateless Society".
 Chaos Theory by Robert P. Murphy. Kaye said that Huemer's book was superior to Chaos Theory.
 Order Without Law: How Neighbors Settle Disputes by Robert C. Ellickson.
  Libertarian Anarchy: Against the State by Gerard Casey (philosopher).

References

2013 non-fiction books
Books about anarchism
Palgrave Macmillan books
Philosophy books
Anarcho-capitalist books